The New Zealand 1990 Commemoration Medal was a commemorative medal awarded in New Zealand in 1990 to celebrate the 150th anniversary of the signing of the Treaty of Waitangi, and was awarded to approximately 3,000 people.

Background
The New Zealand 1990 Commemoration Medal was instituted by Royal Warrant of Queen Elizabeth II on 9 February 1990. It was to be awarded only during 1990 to about 3,000 people selected in recognition of the contribution they have made to some aspect of New Zealand life, especially the various 1990 celebrations. Subsequently 3,632 medals were awarded.

The medal is known as the Sesquicentennial Medal, because it was issued on the 150th anniversary of signing of the Treaty of Waitangi by representatives of the British Crown and various Māori chiefs from the North Island of New Zealand on 6 February 1840.

The New Zealand 1990 Commemoration Medal is an official medal to be worn on all occasions on which decorations and medals are worn. It is worn after Coronation and Jubilee medals, but before decorations and medals for long service. It is accompanied by a certificate bearing the signatures of the Queen, the Governor-General and the Prime Minister.

Notable recipients
The following list includes notable people who received the New Zealand 1990 Commemoration Medal, and is not an exhaustive list of recipients.

A
 Nancy Adams
 Lance Adams-Schneider
 Ray Ahipene-Mercer
 Greg Aim
 Tofilau Eti Alesana
 Percy Allen
 Phil Amos
 Gary Anderson
 John Anderson
 Noel Anderson
 Robert Anderson
 Ross Anderson
 Jim Anderton
 Prince Andrew, Duke of York
 Jon Andrews
 Derek Angus
 Anne, Princess Royal
 Doug Anthony
 Te Atairangikaahu
 Ian Athfield
 Peter Atkins
 Anne Audain
 Margaret Austin
 Rex Austin
 Graeme Avery

B
 Ron Bailey
 Gary Ball
 Bill Ballantine
 Ann Ballin
 John Banks
 David Baragwanath
 Ron Barclay
 Jim Barnes
 Michael Bassett
 Mary Batchelor
 Margaret Bazley
 David Beattie
 Don Beaven
 Richard Bedford
 C. E. Beeby
 Bruce Beetham
 John Belgrave
 Jim Belich
 Garry Bell
 Bob Bell
 David Bellamy
 Charles Bennett
 Manuhuia Bennett
 Bill Birch
 Dave Bishop
 Gordon Bisson
 Norman Blacklock
 June Blundell
 Jim Bolger
 Joan Bolger
 Reg Boorman
 Betty Bourke
 Lionel Bowen
 John Bracewell
 Don Brash
 Geoff Braybrooke
 Barry Brill
 Bill Brock
 Hilton Brown
 Len Brown
 Michael Brown
 Mick Brown
 Denis Browne
 Tony Browne
 John Buck
 Vicki Buck
 Marguerite Buist
 Philip Burdon
 John Burke
 Kerry Burke
 Carolyn Burns
 Mark Burton
 Hector Busby
 David Butcher

C
 Bruce Cameron
 Gregor Cameron
 Richard Campion
 David Carruthers
 John Carter
 Silvia Cartwright
 Maurice Casey
 Len Castle
 Marlene Castle
 David Caygill
 Charles, Prince of Wales
 Ursula Cheer
 Neil Cherry
 John Chewings
 Muir Chilwell
 Ron Chippindale
 Gordon Christie
 Helen Clark
 John Clarke
 Caryll Clausen
 John Collinge
 Anne Collins
 Fraser Colman
 Ray Columbus
 Ken Comber
 Graham Condon
 Jeremy Coney
 Sandra Coney
 Craig Connell
 Mick Connelly
 Robin Cooke
 Angus Cooper
 Michael Cooper
 Morrin Cooper
 Warren Cooper
 Whina Cooper
 Assid Corban
 Miriam Corban
 Paul Cotton
 Ben Couch
 Mel Courtney
 Joy Cowley
 Michael Cox
 Wyatt Creech
 Sharon Crosbie
 Barry Crump
 Max Cryer
 Michael Cullen
 Peter Cullinane
 Allen Curnow
 Barry Curtis

D
 Barry Dallas
 John Daly-Peoples
 Kevin Darling
 Trevor Davey
 Sonja Davies
 Brian Davis
 Te Aue Davis
 Ronald Davison
 Graham Davy
 Neil Dawson
 Trevor de Cleene
 Geoffrey de Deney
 Roderick Deane
 Monita Delamere
 Miriam Dell
 Richard Dell
 Charlie Dempsey
 Avinash Deobhakta
 Susan Devoy
 Colleen Dewe
 Margaret di Menna
 Allan Dick
 Colin Dickinson
 Ian Dickison
 Jack Dodd
 Lynley Dodd
 Tim Dodds
 Akoka Doi
 Chris Doig
 Haddon Donald
 Joan Donley
 Felix Donnelly
 Nigel Donnelly
 Malcolm Douglas
 Roger Douglas
 Bernard Dowiyogo
 Gavin Downie
 Tessa Duder
 Michael Duffy
 John Dunmore
 Peter Dunne
 Eddie Durie
 Mason Durie
 Harry Duynhoven
 Jeremy Dwyer

E
 Paul East
 Elizabeth Edgar
 Sandra Edge
 Prince Edward
 Jim Edwards
 Eunice Eichler
 Jack Elder
 Sian Elias
 John Elliott
 Brian Elwood
 Jonathan Elworthy
 Peter Elworthy
 Timothy Elworthy
 Glen Evans
 Margaret Evans
 Dean Eyre

F
 David Fagan
 John Falloon
 Bob Fenton
 Bruce Ferguson
 Taito Phillip Field
 Betty Flint
 Alan Frampton

G
 Bill Gallagher
 Roy Geddes
 Lowell Goddard
 Thomas Goddard
 Janet Grieve

H
 Elizabeth Hanan
 Anne Hare
 Bryce Harland
 Jenny Harper
 Graeme Harrison
 Pat Harrison
 Ann Hartley
 Lyn Hartley
 Bob Harvey
 David Hay
 Carolyn Henwood
 John Hickman
 Michael Hill
 Peter Hillary
 John Hinchcliff
 Bronwen Holdsworth
 Beverley Holloway
 Peter Hooper
 Trevor Horne
 Parekura Horomia
 Rosie Horton
 Archie Houstoun
 Michael Houstoun
 Judy Howat
 Allan Hubbard
 Helen Hughes
 Keri Hulme
 Don Hunn
 Jonathan Hunt
 Pat Hunt
 Ian Hunter
 Lorrie Hunter
 Sid Hurst
 Les Hutchins

I
 Kīngi Īhaka
 Trevor Inch
 John Ingram
 Courtney Ireland
 Kevin Ireland
 Eddie Isbey
 Loimata Iupati

J
 Guy Jansen
 Ross Jansen
 Michael Jones
 Anne Judkins

K
 Barbara Kendall
 Elspeth Kennedy
 Annette King
 Rex Kirton
 Gary Knapp
 Peggy Koopman-Boyden

L
 Bill Laney
 Harry Lapwood
 David Ledson
 Di Lucas
 Sybil Lupp
 Patrick Lynch

M
 Brian MacDonell
 Patrick Mahony
 Apirana Mahuika
 Malvina Major
 Wilf Malcolm
 Emarina Manuel
 Denis Marshall
 Kerry Marshall
 Russell Marshall
 Richard Mayson
 Lesley Max
 Thaddeus McCarthy
 David McGee
 Ian McKinnon
 Jim McLay
 Alec McLean
 Ian McLean
 Joan Metge
 Ross Meurant
 Patrick Millen
 Bruce Miller
 Barbara Moore
 Garry Moore
 Mike Moore

O
 W. H. Oliver
 Alex O'Shea
 John O'Shea

P
 Denis Pain
 Rose Pere
 Prince Philip, Duke of Edinburgh
 Alexia Pickering
 Simon Poelman
 Judith Potter
 Erenora Puketapu-Hetet

Q
 Derek Quigley
 Ian Quigley

R
 Jack Ridley
 Diane Robertson
 Leilani Rorani
 Jenny Rowan

S
 Laurie Salas
 Guy Salmon
 Anand Satyanand
 Piri Sciascia
 Peter Shirtcliffe
 Brian Shorland
 Cheryll Sotheran
 Dryden Spring
 Evelyn Stokes
 Peter Sutherland

T
 Rob Talbot
 Brian Talboys
 Jeff Tallon
 Howie Tamati
 Tangaroa Tangaroa
 Heather Tanguay
 Iritana Tāwhiwhirangi
 Diggeress Te Kanawa
 Kiri Te Kanawa
 Somerford Teagle
 John Terris
 Ted Thomas
 Geoff Thompson
 Thomas Thorp
 Lindsay Tisch
 Catherine Tizard
 Esme Tombleson
 David Tompkins

U
 Charles Upham

W
 Maureen Waaka
 Beverley Wakem
 Tim Wallis
 David Walter
 Marilyn Waring
 Mark Weldon
 Merv Wellington
 Koro Wētere
 Davina Whitehouse
 Cliff Whiting
 Peter Williams
 Margaret Wilson

Y
 Greg Yelavich
 Neville Young

Z
 Rachael Zister

References

Bibliography
New Zealand Official Year Book, 1990 (page 57)

External links
 The New Zealand 1990 Commemoration Medal royal warrant (SR 1990/24) – legislation.govt.nz
 Obverse of the medal

Commemoration Medal
Civil awards and decorations of New Zealand